Julije is a given name. Notable people with the name include:

Julije Bajamonti (1744–1800), medical historian, writer, translator, encyclopedist, historian, philosopher, and musician from the Croatian city of Split
Julije Kempf (1864–1934), Croatian historian and writer
Julije Knifer (1924–2004), Croatian painter and founding member of the prominent 60s Croatian art group known as Gorgona Group
Julije Makanec (1904–1945), Croatian politician, philosopher and writer